Christopher John Gorman (19 December 1889 – 29 January 1955) was an Australian rules footballer who played with Geelong in the Victorian Football League (VFL).

Notes

External links 

1889 births
1955 deaths
Australian rules footballers from Victoria (Australia)
Geelong Football Club players